The Armstrong was an English automobile manufactured from 1902 to 1904; "claimed to be the best hill-climber extant", the car featured an  International engine.

After 1904, vehicle production came under Armstrong Whitworth.

References

Veteran vehicles
Defunct motor vehicle manufacturers of England
Cyclecars